

Season 
The reigning champions of Internazionale changed his centre-forward, Ramón Díaz, with Jürgen Klinsmann: in German league, he had scored at least 15 goals for season since 1985. In fact, he soon proved his skills scoring twice in Coppa Italia. However, the long-awaited European campaign expired out in the first round: Malmö, champions of Sweden, beaten Inter for 1–0 and then equalized 1–1 in Milan, defeating Trapattoni's side. 

Despite the conquest of domestic supercup, Internazionale was not able to solve the problem of partnership between Klinsmann and Aldo Serena: they also were not strong enough for Milan and Napoli, finishing the league with only a third place.

Squad

Goalkeepers
  Walter Zenga
  Astutillo Malgioglio

Defenders
  Gabriele Baraldi
  Giuseppe Bergomi
  Andreas Brehme
  Riccardo Ferri
  Alberto Rivolta
  Stefano Rossini
  Corrado Verdelli
  Paolo Tramezzani

Midfielders
  Giuseppe Baresi
  Nicola Berti
  Alessandro Bianchi
  Enrico Cucchi
  Pierluigi Di Già
  Andrea Mandorlini
  Gianfranco Matteoli
  Lothar Matthäus
  Fabio Tricario
  Cristiano Scapolo

Attackers
  Dario Morello
  Jürgen Klinsmann
  Aldo Serena

Competitions

Serie A

League table

Matches

Coppa Italia 

First round

Eightfinals

Group phase- Group B

European Cup 

First round

Supercoppa Italiana

References

Sources
- RSSSF - Italy Championship 1989/90

Inter Milan seasons
Inter